The Belarusian Men's Handball Championship is the national league for team handball in Belarus. The current champions are HC Meshkov Brest, who won 14th title in 2021/22 season.

After the launching of the 2022 Russian invasion of Ukraine, the European Handball Federation in February 2022 temporarily suspended the teams from Belarus.

2022-23 Season participants

The following 12 clubs compete in the championship during the 2022–23 season.

List of champions 

 1993 : SKA Minsk
 1994 : SKA Minsk (2)
 1995 : SKA Minsk (3)
 1996 : SKA Minsk (4)
 1997 : SKA Minsk (5)
 1998 : SKA Minsk (6)
 1999 : SKA Minsk (7)
 2000 : SKA Minsk (8)
 2001 : SKA Minsk (9)
 2002 : SKA Minsk (10)
 2003 : HC Arkatron Minsk
 2004 : Meshkov Brest
 2005 : Meshkov Brest (2)
 2006 : Meshkov Brest (3)
 2007 : Meshkov Brest (4)
 2008 : Meshkov Brest (5)
 2009 : Dinamo Minsk 
 2010 : Dinamo Minsk (2)
 2011 : Dinamo Minsk (3) 
 2012 : Dinamo Minsk (4)
 2013 : Dinamo Minsk (5)
 2014 : Meshkov Brest (6)
 2015 : Meshkov Brest (7)
 2016 : Meshkov Brest (8)
 2017 : Meshkov Brest (9)
 2018 : Meshkov Brest (10)
 2019 : Meshkov Brest (11)
 2020 : Meshkov Brest (12)
 2021 : Meshkov Brest (13)
 2022 : Meshkov Brest (14)

Results of the 2021-22 season

References 

 http://handball.by/История-чемпионатов-РБ/Архив.htm

Handball in Belarus
Sports competitions in Belarus
Handball
Professional sports leagues in Belarus